The Doubtful River is a river in the Canterbury region of New Zealand. The Doubtful Range lies to the south. The Doubtless River and Devilskin Stream are tributaries entering from the north.

The New Zealand Department of Conservation maintains a tramping track alongside the river, with routes off to the north and south. Backcountry huts are available for trampers near the junctions with the Devilskin Stream and Doubtless River.

See also
List of rivers of New Zealand

References

Land Information New Zealand - Search for Place Names

Hurunui District
Rivers of Canterbury, New Zealand
Rivers of New Zealand